Couture-Saint-Germain is a village of Wallonia and a district of the municipality of Lasne, located in the province of Walloon Brabant, Belgium.

The village was formed long ago. The Cistercian Abbey of Aywiers was established here in the early 13th century. Saint Lutgardis of Aywiers lived in the Abbey.

External links
Waterloo Tourism
Abbaye d'Aywiers

Sub-municipalities of Lasne
Former municipalities of Walloon Brabant